was a town located in Naka District, Tokushima Prefecture, Japan.

As of 2003, the town had an estimated population of 12,056 and a density of 1,415.02 persons per km2. The total area was 8.52 km2.

On March 20, 2006, Hanoura, along with the town of Nakagawa (also from Naka District), was merged into the expanded city of Anan.

External links
 Anan official website 

Dissolved municipalities of Tokushima Prefecture
Anan, Tokushima